Jason Russell "Rusty" Joiner (born December 11, 1972) is an American male fashion model, fitness model and actor.

Early life and education 
Born in Montgomery, Alabama, and raised in Atlanta, Georgia, Joiner attended Georgia Southern University, where he was a successful athlete, cheerleader, and gymnast for four years. He was also a former gym instructor.

Career 
He was discovered by a model scout in Atlanta and spent the next several years modelling in Milan, Paris, and South America. He has modeled for Prada, Abercrombie and Fitch, American Eagle, Levi's and Powerade. Joiner won the Structure Underwear Model Search, and became the official underwear model for Structure from 1998 to 2000. He has appeared on the covers and pages of Vanity Fair, Cosmopolitan, Rolling Stone, and Men's Fitness. The February 2005 Men's Fitness cover was his eleventh for the magazine in five years.

Joiner also appeared in RuPaul's video Looking Good, Feeling Gorgeous. He has also appeared as "Blade" in Dodgeball: A True Underdog Story (2004), and in Russell Mulcahy's Resident Evil: Extinction (2007).

Filmography

Film

Television

See also

 List of male underwear models

References

External links

Profile and gallery in DNA Magazine

1972 births
Male models from Alabama
Georgia Southern University alumni
Living people
Male actors from Montgomery, Alabama
Male actors from Atlanta
American exercise instructors
American cheerleaders
American gymnasts
Sportspeople from Georgia (U.S. state)
American male film actors
20th-century American male actors
21st-century American male actors
Male models from Georgia (U.S. state)